Nouvelles Mythologies is a collection of 57 texts written by authors, journalists and editorialists under the direction of Jérôme Garcin and published in 2007 at Éditions du Seuil to celebrate the 50th anniversary of the publication of the essay Mythologies by Roland Barthes.

List of myths and their authors 
 Le speed-dating by Nelly Arcan
 Michel Houellebecq by Pierre Assouline
 Les 35 Heures by Jacques Attali
 Le 20-Heure by Marc Augé
 Le plombier Polonais by Nicolas Baverez
 Le GPS by Frédéric Beigbeder
 Les journaux gratuits by Patrick Besson
 Les compagnies Low Cost by Bessora
 La nouvelle ève by Pascal Bruckner
 Le patch by Boris Cyrulnik
 Les séries télévisées by Charles Dantzig
 L'iPod by Angie David
 Zidane by Jacques Drillon
 Le sushi by Jean-Paul Dubois
 La Star academy by Benoît Duteurtre
 Les nouveaux amoureux by Christine Fiszcher
 Le botox by Sophie Fontanel
 Le commerce équitable by Francois Forrestier
 La nouvelle chanson française by Thierry Gandillot
 Le corps nu d'Emmanuelle Béart by Jérôme Garcin
 Les tentes rouges des SDF by Bernard Géniès
 La capsule Nespresso by Alix Girod de l'Ain
 Le voile by Patrick Grainville
 Le SMS by Didier Jacob
 La pensée unique by Denis Jeambar
 Le 21 avril 2002 by Laurent Joffrin
 Kate Moss by Marc Lambron
 Le déclinisme by Aude Lancelin
 Le 11 septembre 2001 by Claude Lanzmann
 Le 4x4 by David Le Breton
 La fièvre de l'authentique by Gilles Lipovetsky
 Le wifi by Alain Mabanckou
 Les people by Patrick Mauriès
 Google by Jacques-Alain Miller
 La poussette surdimensionnée by Catherine Millet
 Arcelor et Mittal by Ghislaine Ottenheimer
 La passion des sondages by Thierry Pech
 Fumer tue by Emmanuelle Pierrat
 Le football roi by Bernard Pivot
 Les OGM by Fabrice Pliskin
 La mort de l'abbé Pierre by Patrick Poivre d'Arvor
 Le phènomène Ducasse by Gilles Pudlowski
 Les bobos by Serge Raffy
 Le blog by Patrick Rambaud
 Le tailleur de Segolène by Philippe Raynaud
 Le grand cabas de fille by Jacqueline Rémy
 La gariguette by Jean-Marie Rouart
 La racaille et le Karcher by Daniel Sibony
 La smart by Yves Simon
 L'euro by Philippe Sollers
 Le digicode by François Taillandier
 Le coaching by Philippe Val
 Parce que je le vaux bien par Georges Vigarello
 La délocalisation by Paul Virilio
 Le vélo en ville by Frédéric Vitoux
 Nicolas Hulot by Arnaud Viviant

External links 
 Jérôme Garcin, ed., Nouvelles Mythologies on Éditions EHESS
 Nouvelles Mythologies on Fabula
 Nouvelles Mythologies on Babelio
 Nouvelles Mythologies on Le Magazine littéraire

2007 non-fiction books
Structuralism
Sociology of culture
Literary criticism
Books about literary theory
Mythology books